Loose Change (Doubleday: Garden City) is a non-fiction biography from 1977 by the American author Sara Davidson.  The book follows the changing fortunes, lives, friendships, attitudes and characters of three women, beginning with their meeting as freshmen at the University of California, Berkeley in the 1960s.  Sara (Davidson), Susie, and Tasha experience the radical changes that went through American culture in that era, observing or being involved in student protests, drug use, the Civil Rights Movement, the 1968 Chicago Democratic Convention, communes, free sex, and the popular music of the times.  Over the course of the book, they become closer and then diverge in their viewpoints and propinquity.

Television miniseries and NBC technical error
A three-part NBC television miniseries, also called Loose Change, was televised February 26 to 28, 1978. Season Hubley and Cristina Raines starred.

When the miniseries was originally televised, NBC broadcast the third part accidentally on February 27 to its East Coast affiliates due to technical difficulties; as after 17 minutes of the third part being played, the wrong part was then replaced with NBC's "Loose Change" telop card along with NBC announcer Howard Reig apologizing on the network's behalf, and went on to the second part, in its entirety. The incident was not recommended in the West Coast affiliates.

The miniseries was re-edited and cut down to four hours (from the original six) and re-broadcast as Those Restless Years July 8 and 15, 1979.

References

 Charles Baxter, "Xavier Speaking", in The Third Coast: Contemporary Michigan Fiction (James Tipton and Robert E. Wegner, eds.), 1981, pages 11–12.

1977 non-fiction books
American biographies
Books about the San Francisco Bay Area
Doubleday (publisher) books
History of Berkeley, California
University of California, Berkeley